F. William Summers (February 8, 1933 – August 12, 2016) was an American librarian and educator in library and information science. Summers held a number of leadership positions in the American Library Association, including serving as the organization's president from 1988 to 1989.

Education and career

Frank "Bill" William Summers was born on February 8, 1933, in Jacksonville, Florida, where he also grew up. He graduated from Florida State University with a Bachelor of Arts in 1955. From 1955 to 1957, Summers served in the U.S. Navy Taiwan Command. He went on to earn a Master of Library Science in 1959 and Ph.D. in 1979, both from Rutgers University.

Summers' first job in a library was as a children's librarian at Jacksonville Public Library. Other positions he held included working as a librarian at the Linden Public Library, as the library director for the Cocoa Public Schools, and as the head of the Florida State Library for five years.

Summers joined the University of South Carolina in 1971, helping to plan the school's new Master of Library Science program; he served as the dean of the library school from 1976 to 1985. In the spring of 1985 he became the third dean of the Florida State University School of Information; Summers was dean of the school until 1994. He also served twice as interim director for the Florida State University Strozier Library.

Library leadership

Summers served in a number of roles in American Library Association (ALA) leadership, including chairing the Committee on Accreditation from 1970 to 1974 and the Committee on Program Evaluation and Support from 1978 to 1982. He served as president of the Association for Library and Information Science Education in 1981. He also was president of Beta Phi Mu, the international honor society for library and information science.

Running on a platform of encouraging leadership in youth librarianship, Summers was elected as president of ALA in 1987, serving from 1988 to 1989. ALA awarded him the Joseph W. Lippincott Award in 1996 for a lifetime of extraordinary dedication to the field of librarianship. Every year, the Florida State University School of Information gives out the F. William Summers Award to an outstanding master’s or specialist student.

Personal life and death
His wife, Lorraine Summers, was the Assistant State Librarian of Florida and served as president of the Association of Specialized and Cooperative Library Agencies. Bill Summers died in Tallahassee, Florida, on August 12, 2016.

References

American librarians
Presidents of the American Library Association
Florida State University alumni
Rutgers University alumni
1933 births
2016 deaths